Jayson Williams (born February 22, 1968) is an American former professional basketball player who played in the National Basketball Association (NBA) for 11 seasons, primarily with the New Jersey Nets. He played his first three seasons with the Philadelphia 76ers, who acquired him in trade with the Phoenix Suns following the 1990 NBA draft. Williams spent the remainder of his career with the Nets and was an All-Star in 1998.

Following his retirement, Williams was charged in 2002 with the accidental shooting death of a limousine driver. He pled guilty to aggravated assault in 2010 and served a 27-month prison sentence.

Early life
Williams was born in Ritter, South Carolina, to Elijah Joshua "EJ" Williams and Barbara Williams. He is of Polish, Italian and African-American descent. His mother Barbara worked for years at Gouverneur skilled nursing facility in lower Manhattan. Raised Catholic, Williams moved to Brooklyn at the age of twelve and attended Christ The King Regional High School and St. John's University, both in New York City, and played on the basketball team at both.

Professional career
Williams was selected by the Phoenix Suns in the first round with the 21st pick of the 1990 NBA draft. His draft rights were thereafter traded by the Suns to the Philadelphia 76ers for a 1993 first-round draft choice on October 28, 1990. After two seasons as a bench player with the 76ers, Williams was traded to the New Jersey Nets for conditional draft choices on October 8, 1992.

While with the Nets, Williams only earned 12 starts in his first three seasons with the team before finally earning a full-time starting position in the 1996–97 season. The following season, on October 31, 1997, Williams set a franchise record with 17 offensive rebounds (20 total) in an opening night 97-95 win over the Indiana Pacers. That season, Williams had a career year, leading the league in offensive rebounds and offensive rebound percentage while also finishing the season in the top five in total rebounds, rebounds per game, total rebound percentage and offensive rating. Williams also received an All-Star game selection, playing in the 1998 NBA All-Star Game.

Injury and retirement
Williams' career came to a sudden end on April 1, 1999, after he broke his right leg in a collision with teammate Stephon Marbury in a game against the Atlanta Hawks. The following day, Williams underwent career-ending surgery in which a plate and five screws were inserted into his leg. After sitting out the entire 1999–2000 season, Williams officially announced his retirement on June 28, 2000, at the age of 32 after 11 seasons. At the time of the injury, Williams was in the first year of a six-year, $90 million contract. In 2005, he briefly came out of retirement to play for the Idaho Stampede of the Continental Basketball Association.

Legal incidents
In 1992, Williams was accused of breaking a beer mug over a patron's head at a saloon in Chicago. Two years later, he was accused of firing a semiautomatic weapon into the parking lot at the Meadowlands Sports Complex. He was never criminally charged in either case.

Assault conviction
On February 14, 2002, 55-year-old limousine driver Costas "Gus" Christofi was shot and killed at Williams's estate in Alexandria Township, New Jersey. Members of Williams's NBA charity basketball team were present at the scene. The New York Post reported that Williams was aiming a shotgun at Gus, while giving a tour of his  home when he fired the weapon, killing Christofi. 

In April 2004, Williams was acquitted of the more serious charges against him, but the court's jury deadlocked on a charge of reckless manslaughter. He was convicted on four counts of trying to cover up the shooting.

On April 21, 2006, a Hunterdon County appeals court ruled that Williams could be retried on a reckless manslaughter charge stemming from the shooting death of Christofi. The court repeatedly delayed the retrial for a series of reasons, such as the State's 2008 appeal of a ruling relating to prosecutorial misconduct at the first trial.

On January 11, 2010, Williams pleaded guilty to aggravated assault. On February 23, 2010, he was finally sentenced to 5 years in prison with possible parole after 18 months. Williams was subsequently moved on April 19, 2011, to Rikers Island to serve an additional 1-year sentence for a DWI, of which he served 8 months and was released from custody on April 13, 2012. On the entire experience, Williams said in a 2012 interview with ESPN: "…I truly don't want to see anybody cause any more pain to anybody. And I don't want to see anybody in a cage, man. Everybody thinks they're so tough and they can go to jail. I've never seen a newbie go to jail and not cry the first two months every night, scream and have to get suicide prevention in front of his cell." Relating specifically to the shooting incident, Williams went on to say "I struggle with the loss of lives. The loss of Mr. Christofi and the loss of my father. An hour doesn't go by that I don't think about [the accident], think about how can I replay this as to bring back Mr. Christofi. And not one person died that night, two people died. My dad had never been in the hospital in 70 years. That's the ripple effect."

Tasering incident
The New York City Police Department (NYPD) reported on April 27, 2009, that Williams was stunned with a taser in a New York City hotel by members of the NYPD after reports that Williams had become suicidal and violent. Upon entering the Manhattan hotel room police said that Williams was visibly intoxicated, and that empty bottles of prescription medications were found around the room. Officers stunned him with the taser and took him to a hospital.

Raleigh bar fight
Williams was arrested on May 24, 2009, for allegedly punching a man in the face at a bar in Raleigh, North Carolina. He was charged with simple assault. Later the charges were dropped.

DWI incident
On January 5, 2010, Williams was charged with driving while intoxicated after an early morning accident in lower Manhattan, in which he crashed his Mercedes into a tree. On August 20, 2010, he was sentenced to an additional year in prison, to be added on to the five-year prison sentence for the shooting death of a limousine driver. He additionally received a $16,433 fine for the damage to the tree. Williams was released from prison in April 2012.

Indoor lacrosse
Williams was the principal owner of the New Jersey Storm of the National Lacrosse League (NLL). The franchise operated for two seasons, 2002 and 2003, before moving to Anaheim, California, and becoming the Anaheim Storm. Due to consistently poor results, as well as its presence in tough markets, the Storm failed to make much of an impression and it became defunct before the start of the 2006 season.

Books
In 2001, Williams authored a book about basketball entitled Loose Balls. The book, intended largely to be a humorous recollection of Williams's life in the NBA, was later cited as containing nine separate anecdotes involving his tendency to play with guns, including one where football player Wayne Chrebet is nearly shot and one where the uncle of Manute Bol is threatened with an unloaded handgun.

In 2012, Williams published a second book, an autobiography entitled Humbled ~ Letters From Prison. The book includes revelations about being abused as a child.

A third book, Crashing: A Memoir, was published in December 2018.

Personal life
In 1996, Williams proposed during halftime of a nationally televised basketball game to model Cynthia Bailey. The two later parted.

Williams married Kellie Batiste in December 1999; they divorced soon afterward. In 2000, he married Tanya Young and together they had two daughters. The couple divorced in 2011. Young was a cast member of VH1's reality TV show Basketball Wives: LA.

Williams' father, Elijah Joshua Williams, died of a stroke aged 76 in November 2009. All 3 of his sisters died tragically. Two from AIDS (one after a blood transfusion following a mugging), and another was killed by her husband in a murder-suicide.

Legacy 
In 2022, St. John's University announced intentions to induct Williams into their athletics Hall of Fame.

NBA career statistics

Regular season

|-
| style="text-align:left;"|1990–91
| style="text-align:left;"|Philadelphia
| 52 || 1 || 9.8 || .447 || .500 || .661 || 2.1 || .3 || .2 || .1 || 3.5
|-
| style="text-align:left;"|1991–92
| style="text-align:left;"|Philadelphia
| 50 || 8 || 12.9 || .364 ||  || .636 || 2.9 || .2 || .4 || .4 || 4.1
|-
| style="text-align:left;"|1992–93
| style="text-align:left;"|New Jersey
| 12 || 2 || 11.6 || .457 ||  || .389 || 3.4 || .0 || .3 || .3 || 4.1
|-
| style="text-align:left;"|1993–94
| style="text-align:left;"|New Jersey
| 70 || 0 || 12.5 || .427 ||  || .605 || 3.8 || .4 || .2 || .5 || 4.6
|-
| style="text-align:left;"|1994–95
| style="text-align:left;"|New Jersey
| 75 || 6 || 13.1 || .461 || .000 || .533 || 5.7 || .5 || .3 || .4 || 4.8
|-
| style="text-align:left;"|1995–96
| style="text-align:left;"|New Jersey
| 80 || 6 || 23.2 || .423 || .286 || .592 || 10.0 || .6 || .4 || .7 || 9.0
|-
| style="text-align:left;"|1996–97
| style="text-align:left;"|New Jersey
| 41 || 40 || 34.9 || .409 || .000 || .590 || 13.5 || 1.2 || .6 || .9 || 13.4
|-
| style="text-align:left;"|1997–98
| style="text-align:left;"|New Jersey
| 65 || 65 || 36.0 || .498 || .000 || .666 || 13.6 || 1.0 || .7 || .8 || 12.9
|-
| style="text-align:left;"|1998–99
| style="text-align:left;"|New Jersey
| 30 || 30 || 34.0 || .445 || .000 || .565 || 12.0 || 1.1 || .8 || 2.0 || 8.1
|- class="sortbottom"
| style="text-align:center;" colspan="2"|Career
| 475 || 158 || 20.6 || .440 || .125 || .606 || 7.5 || .6 || .4 || .6 || 7.3
|- class="sortbottom"
| style="text-align:center;" colspan="2"|All-Star
| 1 || 0 || 19.0 || .667 ||  ||  || 10.0 || 1.0 || .0 || .0 || 4.0

Playoffs

|-
| style="text-align:left;"|1991
| style="text-align:left;"|Philadelphia
| 4 || 0 || 2.5 || .800 ||  ||  || 1.0 || .0 || .0 || .0 || 2.0
|-
| style="text-align:left;"|1994
| style="text-align:left;"|New Jersey
| 2 || 0 || 8.5 || .000 ||  || .500 || 1.5 || .0 || .0 || .0 || .5
|-
| style="text-align:left;"|1998
| style="text-align:left;"|New Jersey
| 3 || 2 || 38.7 || .429 ||  || .500 || 14.0 || 1.7 || .7 || 1.0 || 7.0
|- class="sortbottom"
| style="text-align:center;" colspan="2"| Career
| 9 || 2 || 15.9 || .448 ||  || .500 || 5.4 || .6 || .2 || .3 || 3.3

References

Further reading

External links

 

1968 births
Living people
21st-century American criminals
21st-century American non-fiction writers
African-American basketball players
African-American non-fiction writers
American autobiographers
American male non-fiction writers
American men's basketball players
American people convicted of assault
American people of Polish descent
American prisoners and detainees
American sportspeople convicted of crimes
American writers of Italian descent
Basketball players from South Carolina
Centers (basketball)
Criminals from New Jersey
Idaho Stampede (CBA) players
National Basketball Association All-Stars
National Basketball Association broadcasters
New Jersey Nets players
People from Alexandria Township, New Jersey
People from Colleton County, South Carolina
Philadelphia 76ers players
Phoenix Suns draft picks
Power forwards (basketball)
Prisoners and detainees of New Jersey
St. John's Red Storm men's basketball players
Writers from New Jersey
21st-century American male writers
21st-century African-American writers
20th-century African-American sportspeople
African-American Catholics